These hits topped the Dutch Top 40 in 1993 (see 1993 in music).

See also
1993 in music

1993 in the Netherlands
1993 record charts
1993